Hsin Wen-bing (1 February 1912 – 20 March 1999) was a Taiwanese politician who served as mayor of Tainan from 1960 to 1964, and a member of the Legislative Yuan between 1973 and 1981. After retiring from the public office, he became the first elected president of the South Taiwan Artisan School (ATAS) on December 15, 1969, later renamed the Southern Taiwan University of Technology (STUT). Hsin retired in 1988.

To commemorate Hsin, an avid proponent of reading, STUT established an exhibition room, the Hsin Wen-Bing Museum, to display his collection of books.

External links
 http://www.stut.edu.tw

Taiwanese people of Hoklo descent
Mayors of Tainan
Presidents of universities and colleges in Taiwan
Kuomintang Members of the Legislative Yuan in Taiwan
Tainan Members of the Legislative Yuan
Members of the 1st Legislative Yuan in Taiwan
1912 births
1999 deaths
Yunlin County Members of the Legislative Yuan
Chiayi County Members of the Legislative Yuan